Devodrick "Buddy" Johnson (born February 27, 1999) is an American football linebacker who is a free agent. He played college football at Texas A&M and was drafted by the Pittsburgh Steelers in the fourth round of the 2021 NFL Draft.

Professional career

Pittsburgh Steelers
Johnson was drafted by the Pittsburgh Steelers in the fourth round, 140th overall, of the 2021 NFL Draft. On May 18, 2021, Johnson signed his four-year rookie contract with Pittsburgh.

On August 30, 2022, Johnson was waived by the Steelers.

San Francisco 49ers
On September 5, 2022, Johnson signed with the practice squad of the San Francisco 49ers. He was released on October 18.

Houston Texans
On November 1, 2022, Johnson was signed to the Houston Texans practice squad.

References 

1999 births
Living people
Players of American football from Dallas
American football linebackers
Texas A&M Aggies football players
Pittsburgh Steelers players
San Francisco 49ers players
Houston Texans players